Live from New York may refer to "Live from New York, it's Saturday Night!", a line ending the cold opening of each episode of the American television show Saturday Night Live (SNL).  Other SNL-related references include:

 Gilda Radner: Live From New York, a 1979 one-woman show by Gilda Radner, later released as the film Gilda Live
 Live from New York: An Uncensored History of Saturday Night Live, a 2002 book by Tom Shales and James Andrew Miller
 Live from New York!, a 2015 documentary film on the history of SNL

Music
 Tori Amos: Live from New York, a 1998 concert video and album by Tori Amos
 Live from New York (Tori Amos album), album of the concert
 Live from New York (Jesus Culture album)
Live from New York, album by Phil Woods 1982
Live from New York, album by John Abercrombie / Andy LaVerne 2010
Live from New York, album by  Donna Summer 2008 album and DVD
Beacon Theatre: Live from New York Joe Bonamassa 2012
Live from New York, video by Marc Anthony 2005
Live from New York, album by  Raekwon 1999